Mount Ararat Baptist Church is a historic church at 1920 Slayden Avenue, Ensley in Birmingham, Alabama.  It is located in the Ensley suburb, west of downtown Birmingham, and overlooks Highway 239.  It was originally built in 1929 but was modified in 1950 to add a red brick veneer.

It was added to the National Register of Historic Places in 2005.  It has also been known as Mount Ararat Missionary Baptist Church.

It was designed by African-American architect Wallace Rayfield and is described as having "a restrained Gothic Revival design".  It is a cross-gabled church originally built in 1929 but veneered in smooth varitone red brick in 1950. It has a concrete foundation and a multi-gable asphalt shingle roof.

The church is significant for its association during 1956 to 1963 with the Alabama Christian Movement for Human Rights and with the Civil Rights Movement in Birmingham.

References

External links
 See also: 

Baptist churches in Alabama
Churches on the National Register of Historic Places in Alabama
National Register of Historic Places in Birmingham, Alabama
Gothic Revival church buildings in Alabama
Churches completed in 1929
Churches in Birmingham, Alabama